Chris Jones (born October 8, 1973) is an American former sprinter.

References

1973 births
Living people
American male sprinters
Place of birth missing (living people)
Athletes (track and field) at the 1995 Pan American Games
Universiade medalists in athletics (track and field)
Universiade gold medalists for the United States
Pan American Games track and field athletes for the United States